McQuistan is a surname. Notable people with the surname include:

Dugald McQuistan (1879–1946) Scottish mathematician
Finlay McQuistan (1896–?), British World War I flying ace
Pat McQuistan (born 1983), American football player
Paul McQuistan (born 1983), American football player